Baby mama is a slang term for an unmarried mother.

Baby mama may also refer to:

 Baby Mama (film), a 2008 comedy starring Amy Poehler and Tina Fey
 "Baby Mama" (Fantasia song), a 2005 song by Fantasia Barrino
 "Baby Mama" (Brandy song), a 2020 song by Brandy